Mojavemyinae is an extinct subfamily of geomyoid rodents. When Mojavemyinae was named, it was not assigned to a family, with a relationship to either Geomyidae or Heteromyidae considered equally likely (Korth and Chaney, 1999), but consensus places the type genus, Mojavemys, in Geomyidae (McKenna and Bell, 1997; Feranec et al., 2005).

References

 Feranec, R.S., Barnosky, A.D. and Quang, C.N. 2005. New populations and biogeographic patterns of the geomyid rodents Lignimus and Mojavemys from the Barstovian of western Montana. Journal of Vertebrate Paleontology 25(4):962-975.
 Korth, W.W., and Chaney, D.S. 1999. A new subfamily of geomyoid rodents (Mammalia) and a possible origin of Geomyidae. Journal of Paleontology 73(6):1191-1200. 
 McKenna, Malcolm C., and Bell, Susan K. 1997. Classification of Mammals Above the Species Level. Columbia University Press, New York, 631 pp. 

Geomyoid rodents
Prehistoric rodents
Mammal subfamilies